Nagurski is a surname. Notable people with the surname include:

Bronko Nagurski (1908–1990), Canadian-born National Football League player and professional wrestler
Bronko Nagurski, Jr. (1937–2011), his son, American-born Canadian Football League player
Jan Nagórski or Ivan Nagurski (1888–1976), Polish aviation pioneer

See also
 
 Nagorski

Polish-language surnames